The Bipolar Spectrum Diagnostic Scale (BSDS) is a psychiatric screening rating scale for bipolar disorder. It was developed by Ronald Pies, and was later refined and tested by  S. Nassir Ghaemi and colleagues. The BSDS arose from Pies's experience as a psychopharmacology consultant, where he was frequently called on to manage cases of "treatment-resistant depression," which sometimes turns out to be a depressed phase in a bipolar disorder. The lifetime prevalence of BD is approximately 1%, rising to 4% if a broader definition of bipolar spectrum disorder is used.

The English version of the scale consists of 19 question items and two sections. It differs from most scales in that it does not list separate items, but rather presents a short paragraph talking about experiences that people with bipolar spectrum disorders often have. The person checks off which phrases or experiences fit them. Bipolar spectrum disorder includes bipolar I and II, and other cases not meeting criteria for those disorders.

The scale was validated in its original version and demonstrated high diagnostic sensitivity, meaning that most people with confirmed bipolar diagnoses scored high on the BSDS. The BSDS may do better than other scales at detecting types of bipolar disorder that do not involve a full manic episode, such as bipolar II or cyclothymic disorder.

In a systematic review and meta-analysis looking at the accuracy of self-report scales for detecting bipolar disorders, the BSDS was one of the best performing options.

See also
 Bipolar disorder
 Rating scales for depression

References

Bipolar disorder
Depression (mood)
Mental disorders screening and assessment tools
Mood disorders
Mania screening and assessment tools
Treatment of bipolar disorder